The Roman Catholic Diocese of Lu'an/Changzhi  (Not to be confused with Lu'an (六安) in Anhui province) is a diocese located in the city of Lu'an in the Ecclesiastical province of Taiyuan in China.
Currently, in standard Mandarin, the name of the city is pronounced "Luan". In the local dialect, it was pronounced, "Lu-ngan", which was why early accounts by Christian missionaries call it by that name. The American presbyterian publication "The Chinese recorder and missionary journal, Volume 3" calls it "Lu-ngan-fu".

History
 October 15, 1696: Established as Apostolic Vicariate of Shansi 山西 from the Diocese of Nanjing 南京
 1712: Suppressed to the Apostolic Vicariate of Shensi and Shansi 陝西山西
 March 2, 1844: Restored as Apostolic Vicariate of Shansi 山西 from the Apostolic Vicariate of Shensi and Shansi 陝西山西
 June 17, 1890: Renamed as Apostolic Vicariate of Southern Shansi 山西南境
 December 3, 1924: Renamed as Apostolic Vicariate of Luanfu 潞安府
 April 11, 1946: Promoted as Diocese of Lu’an

Leadership
 Bishops of Lu'an (Roman rite)
 Bishop Peter Ding Lingbin, O.F.M. (2016–present)
 Bishop Hermengild Li Yi, O.F.M. (1998 - 2012)
 Bishop Francis Gerard Kramer, O.F.M. (1946.04.11 – 1982)

 Vicars Apostolic of Luanfu  (Roman Rite)
 Bishop Fortunato Antonio Spruit, O.F.M. (1927.11.22 – 1943.07.12)
 Bishop Alberto Odorico Timmer, O.F.M. (1901.07.20 – 1927)

 Vicars Apostolic of Southern Shansi  (Roman Rite)
 Bishop Giovanni Antonio Hofman, O.F.M. (1891.04.24 – 1901.07.20)
 Bishop Martin Poell, O.F.M. (1890.06.20 – 1891.01.02)
 Bishop Luigi Moccagatta, O.F.M. (1870.09.27 – 1891.09.06)

 Vicars Apostolic of Shansi  (Roman Rite)
 Bishop Joachin Salvetti, O.F.M. (1815.02.21 – 1843.09.21)
 Bishop Antonio Luigi Landi, O.F.M. (1804.11.07 – 1811.10.26)

References

 GCatholic.org
 Catholic Hierarchy

Roman Catholic dioceses in China
Religious organizations established in 1696
Roman Catholic dioceses and prelatures established in the 17th century
1696 establishments in Asia